Atolla wyvillei, also known as the Atolla jellyfish or Coronate medusa, is a species of deep-sea crown jellyfish (Scyphozoa: Coronatae). It lives in oceans around the world. Like many species of mid-water animals, it is deep red in color. This species was named in honor of Sir Charles Wyville Thomson, chief scientist on the Challenger expedition.

It typically has 20 marginal tentacles and one hypertrophied tentacle which is larger than the rest. This long trailing tentacle is thought to facilitate prey capture.

This species is bioluminescent. When attacked, it will launch a series of flashes, whose function is to draw predators who will be more interested in the attacker than itself. This has earned the animal the nickname "alarm jellyfish".

Marine biologist Edith Widder created a device based on the Atolla jellyfish's distress flashes called the E-jelly, which has been used successfully and efficiently to lure in mysterious and rarely seen deep-sea animals for filming and documentation. The device's mimicry of the live animal was such that it successfully lured in a giant squid in an expedition financed by Discovery Channel and NHK to find the creature.

Description
These jellyfish do not have a digestive system, a respiratory system, a circulatory system, or a central nervous system.

Distribution and habitat
Atolla wyvillei is found all over the globe in the deep ocean.

Behavior and ecology

Reproduction
Atolla wyvillei can reproduce in two different ways.  They can reproduce asexually like many other jellyfish species.  This process involves the development into polyps that then produce buds that grow into larvae.  Atolla wyvillei can also reproduce sexually.  They attach themselves to another Atolla wyvillei by grabbing them with their hypertrophied tentacle and pulling themselves toward the other to mate.

Feeding
Atolla wyvillei have been found to prey on crustaceans and other floating nutrients. Atolla wyvillei can trap its prey through the use of its hypertrophied tentacle.  It can passively catch its prey by leaving the tentacle extended and allow it to catch things that may be floating nearby.

Bioluminescence
Bioluminescence is the production of visible light by a living organism (Herring 2004). Bioluminescence is a common phenomenon in marine animals found in the deep sea. Atolla wyvillei has adapted a safety response to avoid predation. When Atolla wyvillei is attacked it produces an array of blue light flashes. It is because of these blue flashes that Atolla wyvillei has been nicknamed the “alarm jelly”. It is believed that the purpose of these flashes is to attract a bigger predator than the one that was currently attacking it (Herring 2004). It is an attempt to scare the predator that is currently attacking it with a larger predator that could possibly prey on the predator attacking it.

Threats 
There has been evidence that Atolla wyvillei is threatened by shrimp (Moore, 1993). A close relative of Atolla species, the crown jellyfish is eaten as a delicacy in Japan (Seaunseen, 2014).

References
Citations

Sources
Herring, P. J., (2004). Bioluminescence of deep-sea coronate medusae (Cnidaria: Scyphozoa. Springer-Verlag, 39-51.

External links
 "Eye in sea" catches deep-sea life unawares – Information on this species.

Atollidae
Animals described in 1880
Taxa named by Ernst Haeckel